Likodra is a village in the municipality of Krupanj, Serbia. It had a population of 874 at the 2002 census.

References

Populated places in Mačva District